Guanidinoacetate N-methyltransferase is an enzyme that catalyzes the chemical reaction and is encoded by gene GAMT located on chromosome 19p13.3.

S-adenosyl-L-methionine + guanidinoacetate  S-adenosyl-L-homocysteine + creatine

Thus, the two substrates of this enzyme are S-adenosyl methionine and guanidinoacetate, whereas its two products are S-adenosylhomocysteine and creatine.

This enzyme belongs to the family of transferases, specifically those transferring one-carbon group methyltransferases.  The systematic name of this enzyme class is S-adenosyl-L-methionine:N-guanidinoacetate methyltransferase. Other names in common use include GA methylpherase, guanidinoacetate methyltransferase, guanidinoacetate transmethylase, methionine-guanidinoacetic transmethylase, and guanidoacetate methyltransferase.  This enzyme participates in glycine, serine and threonine metabolism and arginine and proline metabolism.

The protein encoded by this gene is a methyltransferase that converts guanidoacetate to creatine, using S-adenosylmethionine as the methyl donor. Defects in this gene have been implicated in neurologic syndromes and muscular hypotonia, probably due to creatine deficiency and accumulation of guanidinoacetate in the brain of affected individuals. Two transcript variants encoding different isoforms have been described for this gene.

Structural studies

See also
 Guanidinoacetate methyltransferase deficiency

References

Further reading

External links 
 PDBe-KB provides an overview of all the structure information available in the PDB for Human Guanidinoacetate N-methyltransferase

EC 2.1.1
Enzymes of known structure